CHAA-FM is a French-language Canadian radio station located in Longueuil, Quebec, near Montreal.

It broadcasts on 103.3 MHz using a directional antenna located on the tower of the Olympic Stadium with an average effective radiated power of 64 watts and a peak effective radiated power of 263 watts (class A).

The station operates under a community radio licence and identifies itself as "FM 103,3".

Despite being near Montreal and having its transmitter, but not its studios, in the city, the station is focused on Longueuil and as such does not attempt to serve Montreal listeners, even though CHAA-FM does have some listeners there as the station's signal is adequate in many parts of the city.

The station is a member of the Association des radiodiffuseurs communautaires du Québec.

References

External links
 Official website
 CHAA-FM history - Canadian Communication Foundation
 

Haa
Haa
Haa
Mass media in Longueuil
Radio stations established in 1987
1987 establishments in Quebec
HD Radio stations